Clemer Melo da Silva or simply Clemer (born October 20, 1968 in São Luís), is a Brazilian retired footballer who played as goalkeeper and current manager.

Career
On March 4, 1997, he scored his first goal, in a Copa do Brasil match between his club, Portuguesa, and Kaburé. On May 4, 2008 he scored his first goal for Internacional in a penalty kick in the final match of Campeonato Gaúcho against Juventude.

On January 4, 2010, Internacional announced Clemer as newest Goalkeeping Coach. After he served as coach of the club and driving temporarily the main cast, until its output on May 8, 2015. after fallen out again with the coacher of U-23. in October of the same year, has signed with commanded Glória in season 2016.

List of goals scored

Following, is the list with the goals scored by Clemer:

Honours

Player 
Remo
Campeonato Paraense: 1994, 1995

Goiás
 Campeonato Goiano: 1996

Flamengo
 Campeonato Carioca: 1999, 2000, 2001
 Copa Mercosur: 1999
 Taça Rio: 2000
 Taça Guanabara: 2001
 Copa dos Campeões: 2001

Internacional
Campeonato Gaúcho: 2002, 2003, 2004, 2005, 2008, 2009
Copa Libertadores de América: 2006
FIFA Club World Cup: 2006
Recopa Sudamericana: 2007
Dubai Cup: 2008
Copa Sudamericana: 2008
Suruga Bank Championship: 2009

Manager 
Sergipe
 Campeonato Sergipano: 2016

References

External links
 

1968 births
Living people
People from São Luís, Maranhão
Brazilian footballers
Brazilian football managers
Association football goalkeepers
Campeonato Brasileiro Série A players
Campeonato Brasileiro Série A managers
Campeonato Brasileiro Série B managers
Campeonato Brasileiro Série D managers
Moto Club de São Luís players
Esporte Clube Santo André players
Maranhão Atlético Clube players
Ferroviário Atlético Clube (CE) players
Clube do Remo players
Goiás Esporte Clube players
Associação Portuguesa de Desportos players
CR Flamengo footballers
Sport Club Internacional players
Sport Club Internacional managers
Grêmio Esportivo Glória managers
Club Sportivo Sergipe managers
Grêmio Esportivo Brasil managers
Sportspeople from Maranhão